Michael "Mike" Peter Lewis (born April 15, 1981) is a Canadian rower and a Chemistry teacher. He was born in Victoria, British Columbia.

Lewis won a bronze in the men's lightweight fours at the 2008 Summer Olympics with Iain Brambell, Liam Parsons and Jon Beare.

Lewis taught at GW Graham Secondary in Chilliwack for one semester from September 2017 to February 2018. He is currently teaching at Sardis Secondary

References

External links
 Profile at Rowing Canada

1981 births
Living people
Olympic rowers of Canada
Olympic bronze medalists for Canada
Rowers at the 2008 Summer Olympics
Rowers from Victoria, British Columbia
University of Victoria alumni
Olympic medalists in rowing
Canadian male rowers
Medalists at the 2008 Summer Olympics
Pan American Games medalists in rowing
Pan American Games silver medalists for Canada
Rowers at the 2003 Pan American Games
Medalists at the 2003 Pan American Games
21st-century Canadian people